Damian Dróżdż (born 20 December 1996) is a motorcycle speedway rider from Poland.

Career
Dróżdż rode in the top tier of British Speedway, riding for the Belle Vue Aces in the SGB Premiership 2018. He rode in Poland for Kolejarz Rawicz from 2020 to 2022.

References 

1994 births
Living people
Polish speedway riders
Belle Vue Aces riders